John Thomas Hakin (17 October 1882 – 1950) was an English professional footballer who played in the Football League for Grimsby Town between 1906 and 1908. An inside left, he joined Grimsby from Midland League club Mexborough Town. On leaving the club he spent the 1908–09 season playing in the Southern League and the Western League for Plymouth Argyle, and later played for Portsmouth and Rotherham County.

He later worked as a groundsman in Grimsby.

References

1882 births
1950 deaths
People from Mexborough
Footballers from Doncaster
English footballers
Association football forwards
Mexborough Town F.C. players
Grimsby Town F.C. players
Plymouth Argyle F.C. players
Portsmouth F.C. players
Rotherham County F.C. players
English Football League players
Southern Football League players
Date of death missing